Schönefeld is a city quarter in the Northeast of Leipzig. Concerning administrative matters Schönefeld-Ost is a  district of Leipzig, while the rest of Schönefeld, together with Abtnaundorf forms a district called Schönefeld-Abtnaundorf.

History 

In 1270 the margravial village of "Schonenuelt" was mentioned the first time. From 1307 until the Reformation the village belonged to the Canons Regular of St. Augustine cloister St Thomas in Leipzig. In 1527 the village church was rebuilt after being destroyed by a fire. After devastation in the Thirty Years' War the former owner Georg H. von Thümmel ordered the rebuilding of the manor-house in baroque style. On May 27, 1738 the writer Moritz August von Thümmel was born. During the Battle of Leipzig in October 1813 the village was completely destroyed, but already in 1820 was the new building of the Protestant church Gedächtniskirche opened. This was where Robert Schumann and Clara Wieck married on September 12, 1840.

During the second part of the 19th century the village turned into a suburb inhabited mainly by workers. The number of inhabitants increased from 889 in 1834 to 14,879 in 1910. Schönefeld was connected to the tram network in 1896 and was suburbanised into Leipzig in 1915.

The first catholic service after the reformation took place in 1921 and auxiliary church was built in 1928, which is still used nowadays.

In the years 1974/76 the tower block area Schönefeld-Ost, containing more than 4,000 GDR apartments, was constructed.

External links 

 Catholic Church in Leipzig-Schönefeld
 Citizens Community Schönefeld

Geography of Leipzig